Calamus oblongus is a species of plant in the family Arecaceae.

References 

oblongus